The Victoria Metropolitan Statistical Area, as defined by the United States Census Bureau, is an area consisting of three counties in the Coastal Bend region of Texas, anchored by the city of Victoria. The area is sometimes referred to as the Golden Crescent Region, though this term is sometimes used to refer to a larger area than just these 3 counties. As of the 2000 census, the MSA had a population of 111,663 (though a July 1, 2009 estimate placed the population at 115,396).

Counties
Calhoun
Goliad
Victoria

Communities
Incorporated places
Goliad
Point Comfort
Port Lavaca
Seadrift
Victoria (Principal City)
Census-designated places
Bloomington
Inez
Unincorporated places
Alamo Beach
Berclair
Dacosta
Fannin
Guadalupe
Indianola
Kamey
Long Mott
Magnolia Beach
McFaddin
Nursery
Placedo
Port O'Connor
Raisin
Telferner
Weesatche

Demographics
As of the census of 2000, there were 111,163 people, 40,157 households, and 29,741 families residing within the MSA. The racial makeup of the MSA was 75.44% White, 5.53% African American, 0.52% Native American, 1.20% Asian, 0.04% Pacific Islander, 15.05% from other races, and 2.21% from two or more races. Hispanic or Latino of any race were 39.27% of the population.

The median income for a household in the MSA was $36,261, and the median income for a family was $41,596. Males had a median income of $34,132 versus $20,344 for females. The per capita income for the MSA was $17,543.

See also

Texas census statistical areas
Golden Crescent Regional Planning Commission

References

 
Geography of Victoria County, Texas
Geography of Calhoun County, Texas
Geography of Goliad County, Texas